Aray  (عاريه)   is a mountainous village in Jezzine, Lebanon.

Etymology

The name of the village, Aray, is derived from the Greek god of warfare, Ares.

Agriculture
Aray is a regional producer of grapes, olives, pines, and jujube.

Industry
Aray is a major producer of olive-oil and olive-oil soap as well as pine nuts.

Geography
Aray lies on a mountaintop, overlooking Jezzine and the Bkassine forest.  Aray is rich in springs and streams, especially the Aray Stream, which is the principal tributary of the Awali river in South Lebanon.

External links
 Aaray, Localiban

Populated places in Jezzine District